Hulkoti is a town in Gadag district of Karnataka state, India. The town is situated on the way from Hubli to Gadag road(NH-63).The town is known for the co-operative movement in Karnataka.K.H. Patil was in the forefront of co-operative movement in this town. The town has many educational institutes.It has state board as well as CBSE school,PU College and Engineering College.

External links 
K H Patil Krishi Vigyan Kendra, Hulkoti
ದೇಶಕ್ಕೆ ನಂ. 1 ನಮ್ಮ ರಾಜ್ಯದ ಈ ಗ್ರಾಮ | First Rank Village :Hulkoti
History of K H Patil
"As you sow..." Deccan Herald
Hulkoti is one of the well developed village in the world. Dr. A.P.J. Abdul Kalam has visited to hulkoti Sri Rajeshwari Vidyaniketan school.

Cities and towns in Gadag district